Myriochapsa psoromica is a species of lichen in the family Graphidaceae. Found in Brazil, it was described as new to science in 2011 as a species of Chapsa. The taxon was transferred to Myriochapsa in 2013.

References

Ostropales
Lichen species
Lichens described in 2011
Lichens of South America
Taxa named by Marcela Cáceres